Charters and Caldicott started out as two supporting characters in the 1938 Alfred Hitchcock film The Lady Vanishes. The pair of cricket-obsessed characters were played by Naunton Wayne and Basil Radford. The characters were created by Frank Launder and Sidney Gilliat. The duo became very popular and were used as recurring characters in subsequent films and in BBC Radio productions. Charters and Caldicott have also been played by other actors including eventually their own BBC television series.

Radford and Wayne's appearances
In their first appearance, in the 1938 Alfred Hitchcock film The Lady Vanishes, Charters and Caldicott are singleminded cricket enthusiasts, whose only initial concern is to get back to England to see the last days of a Test match. They proved so popular with audiences that they returned in the Gilliat-and-Launder film Night Train to Munich (1940, starring Margaret Lockwood). They also appeared in two BBC radio serials, Crook's Tour (1941, also made into a film later that year) and Secret Mission 609 (1942).

In the film of Crook's Tour (1941), their names are shown entered in a hotel register as Hawtrey Charters and Sinclair Caldicott.   Their last screen billing as Charters and Caldicott was in Millions Like Us (1943). They were intended to reappear in I See a Dark Stranger (1946, Launder), but Launder and Gilliat refused to give them the larger roles in the film that Radford and Wayne demanded, as befitting the high-profile actors they had then become. As a result, the actors opted out of the film and two similar but differently named characters were substituted. This falling out, however, left Radford and Wayne contractually disallowed from portraying the characters under the names "Charters" and "Caldicott".

Despite this, Wayne and Radford continued in the same vein, playing similar double acts in several more movies, such as Dead of Night (1945, sequence directed by Charles Crichton), A Girl in a Million (1946, Francis Searle) and Quartet (1948, sequence directed by Ralph Smart). Another recurring cricket-mad pairing played by them were Bright and Early in It's Not Cricket (1949, Alfred Roome), Helter Skelter (1949, Ralph Thomas) and Stop Press Girl (1949, Michael Barry).

Originally in the first draft of Graham Greene’s screenplay, they almost appeared in Carol Reed’s film noir The Third Man before the characters were amalgamated into one, played by Wilfred Hyde-White.

Film appearances
Appearances billed as Charters and Caldicott are in bold. Those not in bold are either unbilled or billed under other names, such as Bright and Early, but are essentially the same character duo. These characters' names are listed with Radford's character's first.

The Lady Vanishes (1938)
Night Train to Munich (1940)
Crook's Tour (1941)
The Next of Kin (1942) as Careless talkers on train
Millions Like Us (1943)
Dead of Night (1945) as Parratt and Potter
A Girl in a Million (1946) as Prendergast and Fotheringham
Quartet (1948) as Garnet and Leslie
It's Not Cricket (1949) as Bright and Early
Passport to Pimlico (1949) as Gregg and Straker
Stop Press Girl (1949) as The Mechanical Types
Helter Skelter (1949) unnamed

Stage appearances
Due to the success of The Lady Vanishes, Radford and Wayne soon appeared on the London stage in the play Giving the Bride Away by Margot Neville (pseudonym for Margot Goyder and Anne Neville Joske in collaboration with Gerald Kirby). The play opened on 1 December 1939 and ran for 57 performances.

Radio appearances
As with their film appearances, Radford and Wayne appeared in various guises on radio. They were still essentially Charters and Caldicott, but with their characters renamed for rights reasons. Self-contained eight-part radio series, made roughly annually, were very popular on BBC radio at the time and they starred in the following:
As "Woolcott and Spencer" in Double Bedlam (1946) and Traveller's Joy (1947)
As "Berkeley and Bulstrode" in Crime Gentleman, Please (1948)
As "Hargreaves and Hunter" in Having a Wonderful Crime (1949)
As "Fanshaw and Fothergill" in That's My Baby (1950)
As "Straker and Gregg", a continuation of their roles in the film Passport to Pimlico, in May I Have The Treasure (1951) and Rogue's Gallery (1952)

In mid-production on Rogue's Gallery, Radford died suddenly of a heart attack at age 55, leaving Wayne to complete the adventure on his own.

Other portrayals
The characters Charters and Caldicott made a re-appearance in the Hammer films' 1979 remake of The Lady Vanishes, with Arthur Lowe as Charters and Ian Carmichael as Caldicott.

In 1985 they were the main characters in a BBC television series, Charters and Caldicott set in the modern day, with Michael Aldridge playing Caldicott and Robin Bailey as Charters.

In the BBC's 2013 telemovie of The Lady Vanishes, Charters and Caldicott do not appear. They were somewhat replaced by the elderly female duo, Evelyn and Rose Floodporter (Stephanie Cole and Gemma Jones).

See also
Charters and Caldicott (TV series)

References

External links
Charters and Caldicott fan site

British comedy duos
Alumni of Balliol College, Oxford
Fictional English people